Of Chaos and Eternal Night is an EP by the Swedish melodic death metal band Dark Tranquillity.  It includes a re-mixed (with new vocals) version of the Skydancer track; "Alone", with Mikael Stanne's vocals instead of Anders Fridén's. The EP was reissued as Skydancer/Of Chaos and Eternal Night.  Fredrik Nordström contributes keyboards on the EP as well as producing it.

Track listing

Credits

Dark Tranquillity
 Mikael Stanne − vocals
 Fredrik Johansson − rhythm guitar
 Niklas Sundin − lead guitar
 Martin Henriksson − bass guitar
 Anders Jivarp − drums

Guests
 Fredrik Nordström − engineering (songs 1-3), keyboards
 Dragan Tanascovic − engineering (song 4)
 Kenneth Johansson − additional personnel

References

Dark Tranquillity albums
1995 EPs
Albums recorded at Studio Fredman
Spinefarm Records EPs